William Earle (born 4 March 1941) is an Australian sprinter. He competed in the men's 100 metres at the 1964 Summer Olympics.

References

1941 births
Living people
Athletes (track and field) at the 1964 Summer Olympics
Australian male sprinters
Olympic athletes of Australia
Place of birth missing (living people)